Paraamblyptilia ridouti is a moth of the family Pterophoridae. It is known from Costa Rica and Peru.

The wingspan is 17–18 mm. Adults are on wing in August and September.

External links

Platyptiliini
Moths described in 1996
Taxa named by Cees Gielis
Moths of South America